Lasse Rise (born 9 June 1986) is a Danish professional footballer who plays in a forward position. He currently plays for Fodboldklubben Prespa.

On 6 December 2011, Rise was called up for Denmark's tour of Thailand in the following January.

References

External links
 
 Career statistics at Danmarks Radio

1986 births
Living people
Danish men's footballers
BK Avarta players
Lyngby Boldklub players
Randers FC players
Esbjerg fB players
Knattspyrnudeild Keflavík players
Næstved Boldklub players
Danish Superliga players
Danish 1st Division players
Association football forwards